Chaetocoelopa is a genus of kelp flies in the family Coelopidae.

Species
Chaetocoelopa littoralis (Hutton, 1881)
Chaetocoelopa sydneyensis (Schiner, 1868)

References

Coelopidae
Sciomyzoidea genera